Lepidoblepharis microlepis is a species of gecko, a lizard in the family Sphaerodactylidae. The species is endemic to Colombia.

Geographic range
L. microlepis is found in Valle del Cauca Department, Colombia.

Reproduction
L. microlepis is oviparous.

References

Further reading
Noble GK (1923). "A new gekkonid lizard and a new brachycephalid frog from Colombia". American Museum Novitates (88): 1–3. (Lathrogecko microlepis, new species, pp. 2–3).
Vanzolini PE (1953). "Sobre a presença do genero Lepidoblepharis no Brasil (Sauria, Gekkonidae)". Papéis Avulsos de Zoologia, São Paulo 11 (14/15): 225–270. (Lepidoblepharis microlepis, new combination). (in Portuguese).

Lepidoblepharis
Reptiles described in 1923